is a Shinto shrine, in Daisen, Tottori, Japan. A number of its structures have been designated Important Cultural Properties.

Origins
Ōgamiyama Jinja is a complex of Shinto shrines, which were created to worship Daisen. Daisen has been worshiped as a holy mountain at least since the 8th century. The small building was set up as a shrine in the Heian period.

History
The original location of this shrine is covered by heavy snow in winter, so another branch of this shrine was built at the foot of the mountain. It is called the winter shrine. In turn, the original shrine was called the summer shrine. 
The winter shrine was originally built at Maruyama, Kishimoto, but moved to Fukumahara and Odaka in Yonago. The summer shrine has remained in its original location since Heian Period.
With the Shinbutsu bunri, literally Shinto-Buddhism-separation after the Meiji restoration, this shrine was formally separated from Daisen-ji, and the summer shrine was renamed Okumiya of Ogami Jinja and the Buddhist objects of worship were removed.
The current main object of worship is "Oanamuchi no Kami".

Important Cultural Properties
 Okumiya Honden - Heiden - Haiden (1805)
 Massha Shimoyama Honden - Heiden - Haiden (1805)
 Large stone Torii (1854)

References

External links
  Ōgamiyama Jinja homepage
 Official Home Page of Daisen Tourist Bureau

Shinto shrines in Tottori Prefecture
Important Cultural Properties of Japan
Beppyo shrines
Daisen, Tottori